Frederik Theodor Kloss (19 September 1802, in Braunschweig – 9 June 1876, in Copenhagen) was a German-Danish painter who specialized in marine painting.

Biography
Kloss attended the Berlin Academy where he studied under Carl Schumann (1767-1827). He travelled to Prague, Breslau and Dresden (1825–27), North Sea (1832), Iceland (1834), the Mediterranean Sea (1843) and the Faroe Islands (1844). On seeing one of Christoffer Wilhelm Eckersberg's marine paintings in Dresden, Kloss decided to go to Copenhagen and become one of his students at the Danish Academy. Over the years, the two became great friends not only in art but also as members of the Free Masons. Kloss became fully integrated into Danish cultural life. After becoming a member of the Academy in 1840, he received a professorship in 1853 and was treasurer from 1867.

Selected works
  (The Great Geyser in Iceland during Eruption) (1835)
  (Danish Men-of-War in the Roads of Copenhagen) (1837)
  (A French-built Man-of-War Cutting away her Masts Swept Overboard in a Storm (1839)
  (The Harbour of Nyborg. In the Foreground the Cutter "Neptun") (1840)

References

External links

1802 births
1876 deaths
Royal Danish Academy of Fine Arts alumni
Artists from Braunschweig
19th-century Danish painters
Danish male painters
19th-century German painters
19th-century German male artists
German male painters
Danish marine artists
Prussian Academy of Arts alumni
19th-century Danish male artists